The 2009 CAF Confederation Cup was the 6th edition of the CAF Confederation Cup, Africa's secondary club football competition organized by the Confederation of African Football (CAF). The competition began with the preliminary round stage in the first week of March 2009 and concluded with the second leg of the final match on the first week of December 2009. The winners played in the 2010 CAF Super Cup.

Qualifying rounds

The draw for the preliminary round and the second round were made on December 4, 2008.

Preliminary round
1st legs played 30 January-1 February 2009 and 2nd legs played 13–15 February 2009, except the ASFAN-USM game which was postponed to Feb. 25.

|}

Dispensation round

|}

Notes

First round
First Legs were played 13–15 March 2009 and second Legs played 3–5 April 2009

|}

Second round
1st Legs to be played 17–19 April 2009 and 2nd Legs to be played 1–3 May 2009

|}

Play-off round
Joined by round of 16 losers of the 2009 CAF Champions League. Winners to Group Stage.
1st Legs were played 17–19 May and 2nd Legs were played 29–31 May 2009.

|}

Group stage

The group stage draw was held before the second round of 16 phase - with teams allocated to groups before the winners of ties were known. Matches were played from 17 July to 20 September 2009.

Group A

Group B

Knock-out stage

Bracket

Semi-finals
The first legs are scheduled on 2–4 October and the second legs on 16–18 October.

|}

Final

The first leg is scheduled on 29 November and the second leg on 5 December. Stade Malien won 3–2 on penalties to win the CAF Confederation Cup.

Top goalscorers

The top scorers from the 2009 CAF Confederation Cup are as follows:

References

External links
Confederation Cup 2009 - rsssf.com

 
2009

2